José Alcázar Tejedor (1850, Madrid - 1907, Madrid) was a Spanish painter of genre scenes; mostly of a religious nature.

Biography 
His first showing was at the National Exhibition of Fine Arts of 1878, and he was awarded a third-class medal at the exhibition of 1881. Two years later, he received another stipend, at the request of the Academia, to continue his studies in Rome.

A second-class medal at the National Exhibition followed in 1887, for a painting of parents celebrating their child's first participation in a mass. He also obtained a second-class medal at an exposition in Pontevedra. In 1892, the  commissioned him to create a painting of a choir, which is now at the Cathedral of Segovia.

A major retrospective was held shortly after his death at the Círculo de Bellas Artes.

Among his notable paintings may be mentioned; The Magician, sold at a raffle to benefit the victims of a flood in Murcia, and The Father of the Poor, which was featured at an exhibition of the Círculo. His principal work is now considered to be the one from the exhibition of 1881, which represented a sacristy where a baptism and a funeral service are being held simultaneously.

References

External links 

 More works by Alcázar @ ArtNet
 Biographical notes @ Fernando Alcolea (blog)

1850 births
1907 deaths
Spanish painters
Spanish genre painters
Artists from Madrid